Mini Transat is a solo transatlantic yacht race which typically starts in France and ends in the Caribbean.

Background

History
Bob Salmon developed the idea of a mini-transatlantic race in the late 1970s in England with the intent of promoting affordable offshore solo racing. It was partially conceived as a response to the trend for bigger and more expensive boats such as sailed in the OSTAR race that seemed to exclude ocean racing for sailors with moderate budgets.

The first Mini Transat started from the Penzance Sailing Club in 1977 and races have since been run biannually in odd-numbered years.  There was a move to Brest, France in 1985, and since then, it has started at various locations in France, such as Brittany, La Rochelle or Charente-Maritime, with a stop in the Canary Islands or Madeira, ending in the West Indies or Brazil.

The Miniclasse 6.50 closely monitors the craft but applies minimal design restrictions, such as length (6.5m), beam (3.0m), draft (approximately 2.0m)

The race runs in odd-numbered years, and was most recently completed in 2019. Sailors had to qualify by covering one of two specified 1,000 mile courses along with having 1,500 miles of ocean racing experience, much of it solo.

Race Culture
There are no prizes and the Mini Transat is not necessarily considered a race for the win. Sailors are competitive yet mutually supportive during training and preparations, they tend to be closely grouped during the race, and a race completion is seen as a personal or national victory that comes with intangible rewards. Non-completion means, at very least, loss of the mini. The race is considered dangerous and there was a drowning during the first leg of the 2009 race. Racers typically sleep only 20 minutes at a time and rely on computerized autopilot systems to keep the craft on course while they sleep. The class is considered an incubator for professional ocean racing as a proving ground for sailing skills, as well as a test platform for larger ocean classes such as the Open 60.

Other than the single-handed transatlantic crossing, there are a number of other races held for the class. In-between years see double-handed events, such as the Mini Fastnet, Mini Barcelona, Select 650 and Open Demi-Cle. The Transat years incorporate more single-handed events.

Equipment

Mini Transat 6.50

For its intended use, racing across the Atlantic Ocean, the Mini 6.50 is very short and beamy, being nearly half as wide as it is long. Its width carries to the stern, providing sufficient stability that the boats can plane as a fast motorboat does: Minis are capable of sailing as fast as 25 knots.  They typically have two connected rudders and a narrow steel or iron fin keel with a lead bulb at the end, with a mast height typically twice the Mini's length. They also have a retractable bowsprit that extends a spinnaker-genoa "kite" two or more meters beyond the bow.  Minis must be self-righting when capsized, and this is tested by pushing the end of the mast under water with the vessel's hatches open; this design avoids the possibility of turtling.

There are two divisions: production and prototype.  Production boats use approved designs and comparatively conservative materials. The prototype division is more liberal with respect to dimensions, such as keel depth and mast height, and it allows for advanced technology such as "canting" keels and carbon-fibre masts. The prototype class is approximately 7% faster. By far, the most successful mini design is the commercially produced Pogo 2 designed by Jean-Marie Finot of Groupe Finot (now Finot-Conq) in 1995.

Criticism

In response to the perceived challenge of sailing small high-performance single handed boats, Classemini has created rigorous trials, equipment, and inspection requirements to add sanity to the race.  Also, it might be said that the division within the class, production vs. prototype, unnecessarily divides the race. The mini Transat remains a largely French race with only about 30% non-French racers.

The 650 class is admitted to be a "test bed" for mechanisms to be used on bigger and far more expensive open classes.   On the other hand, David Raison's Mini introduces a whole new hull shape with its 2011 victory, which may, in fact, revolutionize open ocean racing if not sailing altogether; and the 2011 race suffered no casualties.

Course

Winners and Equipment

References

Notes

Citations

External links

 
 Mini Transat on the Classe Mini website 

Recurring events established in 1977
Sailing competitions in Brazil
Sailing competitions in France
Single-handed sailing competitions
Yachting races
Transatlantic sailing competitions